Scrupulous Anonymous is a Roman Catholic monthly newsletter and website published by Liguori Publications. It is a ministry of the Redemptorists, and the Redemptorist Congregation, founded by Saint Alphonsus Liguori.

The monthly newsletter is written primarily for individuals who need help in dealing with scrupulosity. Alphonsus Liguori, a Doctor of the Church suffered from "scruples" and feelings of religious guilt in his own life, and developed techniques for helping people with the same condition. Ignatius Loyola, founder of the Jesuits, also struggled with scrupulosity.

The newsletter features a main article and a section dedicated to answering questions submitted by readers.

Many people, at one time or another, struggle with faith issues about sin, guilt, punishment, and hell. But a small few, particularly Catholics, so fear offending God—or fear never being forgiven by God—that they are unable to participate in daily life without experiencing severe doubt and anxiety. Rather than experiencing faith as a source of peace, their faith causes them to dwell on or second guess every decision they make.

Psychologist William Van Ornum reported a survey of one thousand subscribers to Scrupulous Anonymous and documented their feelings of anguish and suffering.

In his book The Doubting Disease Joseph Ciarrocchi stated that: "I have found the newsletter a useful adjunct to therapy for religious persons".

Based on a half-century of questions and answers published in the Scrupulous Anonymous newsletter, the book Understanding Scrupulosity: Questions and Encouragement addresses concerns related to sin, thoughts, dreams, fantasies, and sexuality, as well as confession, self-worth, prayer, and God's grace.

Sources

Catholic newspapers